Rögnvald Eriksson or Ragnvald Eiriksson (c. 920-933) was, according to Egil's Saga, a son of Erik Bloodaxe. It is unclear whether Rögnvald was Erik's son by his wife Gunnhild or by another woman; the Heimskringla does not mention him among Erik's children with Gunnhild. When Egil Skallagrimsson escaped from Norway, he was pursued by Rögnvald, but killed him.

References
Thorsson, Örnólfur, et al., eds. "Egil's Saga". Bernard Scudder, trans. The Sagas of the Icelanders: a selection. Penguin Classics, 2000.

Fairhair dynasty